Cecil Henry Hamilton Cooper (25 October 1871 –  6 January 1942) was Dean of Carlisle from 1933 to 1938.

Born into an ecclesiastical family in Beyton, Suffolk, Cooper was the son of Henry William Cooper, sometime Vicar of West Norwood. he was educated at Pocklington School and Keble College, Oxford and ordained in 1895. After curacies at St Mary's Alverstoke and St Faith with St Cross Hospital, Winchester he  held incumbencies in Winchester and Scarborough before being appointed Archdeacon of York in 1923. A decade later he was elevated to the Deanery, retiring in 1938. He died on 6 January 1942.

References

1871 births
People educated at Pocklington School
Alumni of Keble College, Oxford
Archdeacons of York
Deans of Carlisle
1942 deaths